Basilan's at-large congressional district refers to the lone congressional district of the Philippines in the province of Basilan. The province has been represented in the country's national legislatures since 1984. It first elected a representative provincewide at-large during the 1984 Philippine parliamentary election following the restoration of provincial and city district representation in the Batasang Pambansa where Basilan had previously been included in the regionwide representation of Western Mindanao (Region IX) for the interim parliament. The province, created by the 1973 separation from Zamboanga del Sur of the entire island with its two municipal districts and the municipality of Isabela outside its poblacion which was earlier organized as the City of Basilan separated from Zamboanga City, was formerly represented as part of Zamboanga del Sur's, Zamboanga's and Department of Mindanao and Sulu's at-large representations in earlier legislatures. Since the 1987 restoration of Congress following the ratification of a new constitution, Basilan has been entitled to one member in the House of Representatives. It is currently represented in the 19th Congress by Mujiv Hataman of the Basilan Unity Party (BUP).

Representation history

Election results

2022

2019

2016

2013

2010

See also
Legislative districts of Basilan

References

Congressional districts of the Philippines
Politics of Basilan
1984 establishments in the Philippines
At-large congressional districts of the Philippines
Congressional districts of Bangsamoro
Constituencies established in 1984
Congressional districts of Zamboanga Peninsula